Arthur Seward (April 27, 1876 – March 10, 1950) was an American boxer. He competed in the men's lightweight event at the 1904 Summer Olympics.

References

1876 births
1950 deaths
American male boxers
Olympic boxers of the United States
Boxers at the 1904 Summer Olympics
Sportspeople from Michigan
Lightweight boxers